Nicodemo Petteruti (born 1 July 1940) is an Italian politician and engineer.

He is current member of the Democratic Party. He was born in Roccamonfina, Italy. He has served as Mayor of Caserta from 2006 to 2011. He graduated in engineering. He held the position of director of the Order of engineers of Caserta. He was councilor for public works for the town of Caserta.

See also
 List of mayors of Caserta

References

External links
 Nicodemo Petteruti on Openpolis
 Nicodemo Petteruti on RadioRadicale.it
 Nicodemo Petteruti on amministratori.interno.gov.it.

Living people
1940 births
Democratic Party (Italy) politicians
21st-century Italian politicians
20th-century Italian politicians
Mayors of Caserta
Italian engineers